David William Preece (28 May 1963 – 20 July 2007) was an English professional footballer who played in midfield. He was born in Bridgnorth. He played three times for the England B team.

Career

Preece began his career as an apprentice with Walsall, turning professional in July 1980. His debut came the following year, as a substitute in the 2–1 win against Chester City. He was signed by Luton Town manager David Pleat in December 1984 and scored on his debut, a 1–0 win at home to Aston Villa. He went on to win a League Cup winners medal with Luton in 1988 and played nearly 400 times for Luton's first team. He had a testimonial game against Manchester United in 1995 before moving to Derby County on a free transfer in August that year.

He was a bit-part player at Derby, and so he was loaned to both Birmingham City and Swindon Town. In September 1996 he joined Cambridge United on a free transfer. He made 75 appearances there and was appointed as manager Roy McFarland's assistant, before he joined Torquay United as a player/coach, again under McFarland in August 2001. His contract with Torquay was terminated in July 2002, a move which also led to McFarland's resignation, with Torquay chairman Mike Bateson claiming cuts were needed after the collapse of ITV Digital and subsequent reduction in income. He joined Enfield as a player, but left in December 2002 to become assistant manager of Stevenage Borough. However, a change of manager at Stevenage saw Preece return to Enfield as player-coach in February 2003.

In May 2003, Preece was appointed as first-team coach of Telford United. In September 2004 he was appointed as assistant manager of Isthmian League side Walton & Hersham.

Preece died in the early hours of 20 July 2007 after a short illness. At the time he had been in remission for one year following surgery for throat cancer.

The family stand at Luton's Kenilworth Road stadium has since been named The David Preece Stand in memory of him.

References

External links
Profile at official Luton Town website

Walsall F.C. Tribute
Luton Town Tribute
NMFE Tribute
Memory of "Mini" Preece lives on - tribute on The Roar (an Australian sports opinion website).

1963 births
2007 deaths
People from Bridgnorth
Association football midfielders
English footballers
England B international footballers
Luton Town F.C. players
Walsall F.C. players
Birmingham City F.C. players
Derby County F.C. players
Swindon Town F.C. players
Cambridge United F.C. players
Torquay United F.C. players
Enfield F.C. players
Stevenage F.C. players